Saint Victorinus of Pettau (also Ptuj or Poetovio; died 303 or 304) was an Early Christian ecclesiastical writer who flourished about 270, and who was martyred during the persecutions of Emperor Diocletian. A Bishop of Poetovio (modern Ptuj in Slovenia) in Pannonia, Victorinus is also known as Victorinus Petavionensis or Poetovionensis. Victorinus composed commentaries on various texts within the Christians' Holy Scriptures.

Life
Born probably in Byzantine Greece on the confines of the Eastern and Western Empires or in Poetovio with rather mixed population, due to its military character, Victorinus spoke Greek better than Latin, which explains why, in St. Jerome's opinion, his works written in the latter tongue were more remarkable for their matter than for their style. Bishop of the City of Pettau, he was the first theologian to use Latin for his exegesis.

His works are mainly exegetical. Victorinus composed commentaries on various books of Holy Scripture, such as Genesis, Exodus, Leviticus, Isaiah, Ezekiel, Habakkuk, Ecclesiastes, the Canticle of Canticles, St. Matthew, and the Apocalypse, besides treatises against the heresies of his time. All that have survived are his Commentary on Apocalypse and the short tract On the construction of the world (De fabrica mundi).

Victorinus was much influenced by Origen.  St. Jerome gives him an honourable place in his catalogue of ecclesiastical writers. Jerome occasionally cites the opinion of Victorinus (in Eccles. iv. 13; in Ezech. xxvi. and elsewhere), but considered him to have been affected by the opinions of the Chiliasts or Millenarians.  According to Jerome, Victorinus died a martyr in 304.  

By contrast to Jerome's positive reception in the late fourth and early fifth century,  Victorinus's works were condemned and listed as apocrypha according to the Gelasian Decree, a 6th century work.  The decree was attributed to the fifth century Pope Gelasius I; it includes a list of works compiled by heretics or used by schismatics to be rejected and avoided, and lists Victorinus's work there.

Victorinus is commemorated in both the Latin  Catholic Church and the Eastern Orthodox Church on 2 November. Until the 17th century he was sometimes confused with the Latin rhetorician, Victorinus Afer.

Commentary on the Apocalypse
Victorinus wrote a commentary on the Book of Revelation that was later republished in a redacted form by Jerome in the 5th century AD.  An original unredacted manuscript was found in 1918, however. The commentary was composed not long after the Valerian Persecution, about 260. According to Claudio Moreschini, "The interpretation is primarily allegorical, with a marked interest in arithmology."  Johannes Quasten writes that "It seems that he did not give a running commentary on the entire text but contented himself with a paraphrase of selected passages."

The book is interesting to modern scholars as an example of how people in antiquity interpreted the book of Revelation.  Victorinus sees the four animals singing praise to God as the Gospels, and the 24 elders seated on thrones in Revelation 4 are the 12 patriarchs of the 12 tribes of Israel and the 12 apostles.  He also agrees with views that the Whore of Babylon "drunk with the blood of martyrs and saints" represents the City of Rome and its persecutions of Christians, and that The Beast described in chapter 13 represents Emperor Nero.  As Nero was already dead during Victorinus's time, he believed that the later passages referred to Nero Redivivus, a monstrous revived Nero who would attack from the East with the aid of the Jews.

Works 
 On the Creation of the World
 Commentary on the Apocalypse

See also
 Saint Victorinus of Pettau, patron saint archive

Footnotes

References

External links 

November 2 Feasts at OrthodoxWiki.org
Works of Victorinus
Victorinus at Catholic.org
Victorinus at EarlyChurch.org.uk
Victorinus at SaintPatrickDC.org
Victorinus at Catholic-Forum.com
Opera Omnia by Migne Patrologia Latina with analytical indexes
 

Post–Silver Age Latin writers
Church Fathers
4th-century Christian martyrs
3rd-century Romans
4th-century Romans
3rd-century births
300s deaths
People from Ptuj
3rd-century Christian theologians
4th-century Christian theologians
3rd-century Latin writers